Hussain Montassir (2 March 1923 – 14 February 1992) was an Egyptian basketball player. He competed in the men's tournament at the 1948 Summer Olympics and the 1952 Summer Olympics.

References

External links
 

1923 births
1992 deaths
Egyptian men's basketball players
Olympic basketball players of Egypt
Basketball players at the 1948 Summer Olympics
Basketball players at the 1952 Summer Olympics
1950 FIBA World Championship players